Macorna railway station was located on the Yungera line. It served the Victoria town of Macorna. The station closed to passenger traffic on 4 October 1981 as part of the New Deal timetable for country passengers.

References

External links
Melway map at street-directory.com.au

Disused railway stations in Victoria (Australia)